The Cinema Mundi International Film Festival was a film festival, held annually at the end of February, or beginning of March in Brno, Czech Republic between 2010 and 2016.

History 
The first Cinema Mundi International Film Festival took place in late February, early March 2010 in Brno, Czech Republic.  The inspiration for the festival came from the tradition of Brno Exhibition Centre, which was established in 1928 and since then has been attracting international exhibitors to Brno. Josef Čadík, a film fan who has been operating mobile open-air cinemas in the Czech Republic and Central Europe since 1991, established the festival in the desire to create in Brno a similar platform for the world of film. He is the current director of the festival. The main partner of the festival is the South Moravian Region whose administrative body is seated in Brno.

Program 
In addition to screening the most recent selection of films made in Europe and the US, the festival aims at screening films representing the contemporary national cinemas of the countries of Central and South America, Africa and Asia.  When selecting films from these countries in particular, the festival commission pays their special attention to the films that have been submitted to the Academy of Motion Picture Arts and Sciences in the United States (Oscars) for consideration in the category of Best Foreign Language Film.  These films then often become a part of the main competitive section of the Cinema Mundi International Film Festival program. Additional sections of the festival include the latest Czech-language feature films and feature films that represent contemporary film art from three selected countries or a particular region.

Festival jury and winners 
Since the second year of the festival in 2011, the Student Jury selects the best films.  The Jury is formed by students of Masaryk University, the second largest university in the Czech Republic, whose students participate in the realization and organization of the festival to a great extent.  Four Best Films have been chosen and six Special Awards have been bestowed by the Student Jury in the past four years:

Festival guests 
Since its inauguration in 2010, the Cinema Mundi International Film Festival has welcomed several accomplished guests from the world of film, including Goran Marković, director, Serbia; Srđan Karanović, director, Serbia; Lordan Zafranović, director, Croatia; İsmail Güneş, director, Turkey; Yesim Ceren Bozoglu, actress, Turkey; Iveta Grófová, director, Slovakia; João Canijo, director, Portugal; Vladimír Blazevski, director, Macedonia; Juanita Wilson, director, Ireland; Sulev Keedus, director, Estonia; Karel Roden, actor, Czech Republic; Martin Šulík, director, Slovakia; Jiří Menzel, director, Czech Republic; Hilda Hidalgo, director, Costa Rica; Jaroslav Vojtek, director, Slovakia; Anjorka Strechel, actress, Germany; Jaroslav Dušek, actor, Czech Republic; Paresh Mokashi, director, India; Miguel Littín, director, Chile; Justin Molotnikov, director, Scotland; Stephen McCole, actor, Scotland and others.

References 

 "The world comes to Brno". praguepost.com. 24 February 2014. Retrieved 8 September 2014.
 "V Brně začíná filmová událost Cinema Mundi". iDnes.cz. 23 February 2010. Retrieved 6 February 2012.
"Festival Cinema Mundi 2011 nabídne to nejlepší ze světové kinematografie". listyjm.cz. Retrieved 20 January 2013. 
"Mezinárodní filmový festival Cinema Mundi v Brně startuje potřetí". brnonovinky.cz. Retrieved 20 January 2013.

External links 
Kinematograf bratří Čadíků

Brno
Film festivals in the Czech Republic
Tourist attractions in Brno
2010 establishments in the Czech Republic
Recurring events established in 2010
Annual events in the Czech Republic
Defunct film festivals